Waterloo Road is a 1945 British film directed by Sidney Gilliat and starring John Mills, Stewart Granger, and Alastair Sim. It is based on the Waterloo area of South London. According to the British Film Institute database, it is the third in an "unofficial trilogy" by Gilliat, preceded by Millions Like Us (1943) and Two Thousand Women (1944).

Premise
A soldier, Jim Colter (Mills), goes AWOL to return to his home in south London to save his wife from the advances of Ted Purvis (Granger), a philandering conscription-dodger.

Cast
 John Mills as Jim Colter
 Stewart Granger as Ted Purvis
 Alastair Sim as Dr. Montgomery
 Joy Shelton as Tillie Colter
 Alison Leggatt as Ruby
 Beatrice Varley as Mrs. Colter
 George Carney as Tom Mason
 Leslie Bradley as Mike Duggan
 Jean Kent as Toni
 Ben Williams as Corporal Lewis
 Anna Konstam as May
 Vera Frances as Vera Colter
 George Merritt as Air Raid Warden

Production
The film was originally known as Blue for Waterloo.

Stewart Granger later said the film was one of his favourites as his role "was a heel, but a real character".  He says the film was made in ten days while he was also making Love Story. He was particularly proud of the fight scene with John Mills.

Sidney Gilliat said he was taken off the film before it was finished. Production was stopped and there were still some exteriors to be shot. Ted Black had gone and the Ostrers put the film at the end of the dubbing schedule. However, Earl St John who was in charge of Odeon cinemas liked the film and got the dubbing done.

Gilliat said the idea of using Alastair Sim's character as a commentator was his, though based on the original Val Valentine story. However, he thought the device "proved a bit of a mess".

See also 
 Waterloo Road
 Waterloo Bridge
 The Cut

References

External links 

 Waterloo Road at BFI Screenonline
Review of film at Variety
Review in Time Out
Review in The New York Times
MovieMall DVD information

1945 films
1945 drama films
British black-and-white films
British drama films
Films directed by Sidney Gilliat
Films set in London
Gainsborough Pictures films
British World War II films
Films with screenplays by Frank Launder and Sidney Gilliat
1940s English-language films
1940s British films